= Violentor =

Italian metal band

Violentor is an Italian thrash metal band. They have released six albums.

== Discography ==
- Violentor (2011)
- Rot (2012)
- Maniacs (2015)
- Putrid Stench (2019)
- Manifesto di odio (2022)
- Burn in Metal (2024)
